His Majesty's High Court of Chivalry is a civil law (i.e., non common law) court in English and Welsh law with jurisdiction over matters of heraldry. The court has been in existence since the fourteenth century; however, it rarely sits. The sole judge is now the hereditary Earl Marshal of England, the Duke of Norfolk, though if not a professional lawyer, he normally appoints a professional lawyer as his lieutenant or surrogate.

In Scotland, these types of cases are heard in the Court of the Lord Lyon, which is a standing civil and criminal court, with its own judge – the Lord Lyon King of Arms and its own procurator fiscal (public prosecutor) under the Scottish legal system.

History

The court was historically known as the Curia Militaris, the Court of the Constable and the Marshal, or the Earl Marshal's Court.

Since it was created in the fourteenth century the court has always sat when required, except for the short time between 1634 and its temporary abolition by the Long Parliament in 1640 when it sat on a regular basis. During this time the court heard well over a thousand cases, of which evidence survives from 738 cases.

This was instituted by Edward III, along with the Earl and other key personnel. It focused on military discipline and the armed forces, which led to an increased power of the military during this time

Sittings

The court was last convened in 1954 for the case of Manchester Corporation v Manchester Palace of Varieties Ltd; prior to this, the court had not sat for two centuries and before hearing the case, the court first had to rule whether it still existed. The proceedings opened with the reading of various letters patent in order to make clear that the Duke of Norfolk was indeed Hereditary Earl Marshal and that he had appointed Lord Goddard, who was the Lord Chief Justice of England and Wales, as his lieutenant in the court. It also had ruled that the Earl Marshal was allowed to sit in judgment without the Lord High Constable of England, an office which until 1521 was also held as a hereditary dignity by the Dukes of Buckingham. The case itself was that the Palace theatre had been displaying the arms of the Manchester Corporation (now Manchester City Council) both inside and on its seal and this usage implied that it was linked with the city's council. The corporation had requested that the theatre stop using it, but this request had been refused. The court ruled in favour of the corporation.

Appeals from the court
In 1832, the Privy Council Appeals Act 1832 made the Privy Council the appeal court for cases heard by the High Court of Chivalry. From 1 February 1833, following the passage of the Judicial Committee Act 1833, appeals have been heard directly by the Judicial Committee of the Privy Council. Prior to that, and in common with the admiralty and ecclesiastical courts, appeals from the Court of Chivalry were made to the Crown in Chancery, with appeals being heard by commissioners appointed by letters patent under the Great Seal in each case. Sittings by these commissioners became known as the High Court of Delegates by the time of the 1832 Act.

Composition

Judges
Historically the court had two hereditary judges – the Duke of Norfolk as Earl Marshal of England, and the Duke of Buckingham as Lord High Constable of England – but in 1521 Edward Stafford, 3rd Duke of Buckingham was convicted of treason, stripped of his titles and offices, and executed. Since then the office of Lord High Constable of England has only been appointed to perform ceremonial duties during a Coronation and there has only been the Earl Marshal acting as the sole judge.

Lieutenant, Assessor and Surrogate to the Earl Marshal
Sir Edmund Isham Bt DCL 1728–1772
The Lord Goddard 24 October 1954 – 1959
George Squibb, LVO QC Norfolk Herald Extraordinary 1976–1994

Joint Register to the High Court of Chivalry
Lieutenant-Colonel Sir Anthony Wagner KCB Garter Principal King of Arms 27 October 1954–1995
Wilfred Maurice Phillips (Notary Public), 27 October 1954.

Cryer to the High Court of Chivalry
A. H. Smith, 1954

See also

Notes

References

External links
 About the Court of Chivalry
 Regulation of Heraldry in England: the Middle Ages
 Cases in the Court of Chivalry
 A short piece about the Courts of Chivalry
 University of Birmingham Index of Cases
 The High Court of Chivalry in the early seventeenth century

Courts of England and Wales
English heraldry
Heraldry and law
Courts and tribunals established in the 14th century